Communauté de communes Cœur de Chartreuse is a French intercommunality composed of 17 communes, situated in the departments of Isère and Savoie in the Auvergne-Rhône-Alpes region. It was founded on January 1, 2014. It seat is Entre-deux-Guiers. Its area is 356.8 km2, and its population was 17,052 in 2019.

Composition
The communauté de communes consists of the following 17 communes, of which 7 in Isère and 10 in Savoie:

Entre-deux-Guiers (seat)
La Bauche
Corbel
Entremont-le-Vieux
Les Échelles
Miribel-les-Échelles
Saint-Christophe
Saint-Christophe-sur-Guiers
Saint-Jean-de-Couz
Saint-Joseph-de-Rivière
Saint-Franc
Saint-Laurent-du-Pont
Saint-Pierre-de-Chartreuse
Saint-Pierre-d'Entremont, Savoie
Saint-Pierre-d'Entremont, Isère
Saint-Pierre-de-Genebroz
Saint-Thibaud-de-Couz

References

Coeur de Chartreuse
Coeur de Chartreuse
Coeur de Chartreuse